Don Nelson (born 1940) is an American former basketball coach and player.

Don Nelson may also refer to:
Don Nelson (screenwriter) (1927–2013), American screenwriter, film producer and jazz musician
Don Nelson, software engineer
Donn Nelson or Donnie Nelson (born 1962), American basketball executive

See also
Dan Nelson (born 1976), American singer-songwriter
Don Neilson, Canadian country musician
Donald Nelson (1888–1959), American executive and public servant
Donald Gordon Medd Nelson (1914–1989), Canadian Surgeon General
Donald Nelsen (born 1944), American cyclist
Donald Neilson (1936–2011), British criminal